Birkenshaw and Tong railway station served the village of Birkenshaw, West Yorkshire, England from 1856 to 1964 on the Leeds, Bradford and Halifax Junction Railway.

History 
The station opened as Birkenshaw on 20 August 1856 by the Great Northern Railway. It was named Birkenshaw and Tong in late 1856. The station closed to passengers on 5 October 1953 and completely in 1964.

References

External links 

Disused railway stations in Bradford
Former Great Northern Railway stations
Railway stations in Great Britain opened in 1856
Railway stations in Great Britain closed in 1964
1856 establishments in England
1964 disestablishments in England